Walter Robert Szczerbiak Jr. (born March 5, 1977) is an American former professional basketball player and current color analyst for the New York Knicks on MSG Network. He played 10 seasons for four teams in the National Basketball Association, and was named an NBA All-Star during the 2001-02 season. He played college basketball for Miami (of Ohio) University, and is one of five players to have his Miami jersey retired.

Early life
Szczerbiak was born in Madrid, Spain, to Marilyn and Walter Szczerbiak, a former ABA player who helped lead Real Madrid to three FIBA European Champions Cup (now called EuroLeague) championships. While there, he set a Spanish League single-game scoring record, with 65 points. Szczerbiak spent much of his childhood in Europe, during his father's playing career, where he was taught how to speak Spanish and Italian fluently.

When Walt retired, he moved his family back to his native Long Island, New York. Szczerbiak played basketball at Cold Spring Harbor High School in Cold Spring Harbor, New York. As a senior in the 1994–95 season he averaged 36.6 points per game and 15.9 rebounds. He was named the winner of the Richard Sangler Award as Nassau County's outstanding boys' basketball player. Szczerbiak competed for the Long Island team in the 1994 Empire State Games. Despite his outstanding high school statistics, the small size of Szczerbiak's school did not win him the attention of East Coast college coaches, and he went unrecruited.

College career
During the fall of his high school senior year, Szczerbiak and his parents visited the Miami University campus in Oxford, Ohio. The following Monday, despite Walt's wishes for his son to wait before making a decision, Szczerbiak called coach Herb Sendek and committed to play for Miami. Herb Sendek left Miami after 95/96 season and coach Charlie Coles took over and developed Wally Szczerbiak into a starting position.

In his first two seasons there Szczerbiak averaged 8.0 and 12.8 points. As a junior in 1997–98, he burst onto the scene as one of college basketball's leading scorers, averaging 24.4 points per game and earning first-team All-MAC honors despite missing several games with a broken right wrist.

In his senior season, Szczerbiak averaged 24.2 points per game and led the Redhawks to the Sweet 16 in the 1999 NCAA tournament as a #10 seed. Szczerbiak scored a career-high 43 points in a first-round win over #7 seed Washington. He followed that with 24 points in a second round toppling of #2 seed Utah, leading the Redhawks to the Sweet 16. Despite Szczerbiak's 23-point performance, they would eventually lose to Kentucky 58–43. Miami finished the season 24–8.

Szczerbiak was named MAC Player of the Year, and first-team All-American by Basketball News and Sports Illustrated and second-team All-American by the Associated Press (AP).

Szczerbiak finished his college career with a degree in marketing and Miami's second all-time leading scorer with 1,847 points.

In 2001, Szczerbiak became the fifth Miami player to have his jersey retired (#32). In 2009, he was inducted into the Miami University Athletic Hall of Fame.

NBA career

Minnesota Timberwolves (1999–2006)
The Minnesota Timberwolves selected Szczerbiak 6th overall in the 1999 NBA draft. His best year as a pro was in 2002, when he was a coaches' selection to the Western Conference All-Star team. Later he tied a Timberwolves franchise record of 44 points on April 13, 2003, since broken by Kevin Love, Corey Brewer, Andrew Wiggins, Karl-Anthony Towns, Mo Williams, and Derrick Rose. Szczerbiak was coming off the bench for the 2004–05 NBA season. He was uncomfortable with the role and wanted to be a starter. In the 2005–06 season, the former All-Star returned to the starting role.

Boston Celtics (2006–2007)

On January 26, 2006, Szczerbiak, along with Michael Olowokandi, Dwayne Jones and a conditional first-round draft pick, was traded to the Boston Celtics for Ricky Davis, Mark Blount, Marcus Banks, Justin Reed, and two second-round draft picks.

Szczerbiak underwent surgery in the 2006 offseason to fix a knee which had been injured for several months.

In the 2006–07 season, Szczerbiak played well early on, including a 35-point performance against the Charlotte Bobcats early in the season. However, he was soon plagued by several injuries to both ankles, which greatly affected his shooting and jumping ability. Szczerbiak decided to have season-ending surgery on his ankles.

Seattle SuperSonics (2007–2008)
On June 28 (the night of the 2007 NBA draft), the Celtics traded Szczerbiak to the Seattle SuperSonics along with Delonte West and Jeff Green (the 5th overall pick) for Ray Allen and Glen Davis (35th overall).

Cleveland Cavaliers (2008–2009)

On February 21, 2008, Szczerbiak and West were traded by the SuperSonics to the Cleveland Cavaliers in a three-way deal involving the Chicago Bulls that sent Ira Newble and Donyell Marshall from Cleveland to Seattle, Adrian Griffin from Chicago to Seattle, Cedric Simmons, Drew Gooden, Larry Hughes, and Shannon Brown, from Cleveland to Chicago, and Ben Wallace and Joe Smith from Chicago to Cleveland.

Szczerbiak played in 25 regular season games (one start) with the Cavaliers averaging 8.2 points and 3.2 rebounds. He scored 18 points against Detroit on April 16, 2008. Between the SuperSonics and the Cavaliers, Szczerbiak played in 75 games (two starts) and averaged 11.5 points and 2.9 rebounds.

During the 2008 NBA Playoffs Szczerbiak started at shooting guard for the Cavaliers, helping the Cavs defeat the Washington Wizards in the first-round by putting up 26 points and shooting 6–13 from the 3 point line in Game Six. For the playoffs, Szczerbiak averaged 10.8 points per game.

During the 2008–2009 NBA season, Szczerbiak played in 74 games, starting in 5 of them. Given 20 minutes a game, Szczerbiak averaged 7 points, 3.2 rebounds, and 1.1 assists while shooting .450% from the field and .411% from the 3-point line.

Retirement
Szczerbiak was in discussions with the Denver Nuggets in August 2009, about joining the team on a one-year contract. He reportedly rejected a veteran's minimum contract offer from Denver, opting instead to continue to rehabilitate his knee and possibly test the free agent market later.

Szczerbiak harbored hopes of signing a one-year contract with the New York Knicks. However, on November 5, 2009, Szczerbiak revealed he'd had a third surgery performed on his left knee, which doctors told him would almost certainly end his career. According to his doctors, so little cartilage was left in that knee that a fourth surgery would make it difficult for him to have a normal life.

Broadcasting career
Szczerbiak succeeded in making the transition to sports broadcasting, becoming a basketball analyst for CBS College Sports.

Currently, Szczerbiak is an analyst at MSG Network covering the New York Knicks as a color analyst backup for Walt Frazier and contributor to the teams' post-game broadcasts.

Personal life
Szczerbiak is of Ukrainian origin: his grandparents were Ukrainians and met in a refugee camp in West Germany after World War II. After the war, they emigrated to Pittsburgh.

Szczerbiak has a brother, Will, nine years his junior, and a sister, Wendy, thirteen years younger. Wendy played college basketball for Lehigh University.

In 2013, Szczerbiak was inducted into the Ohio Basketball Hall of Fame.

NBA career statistics

Regular season

|-
| align="left" | 
| align="left" | Minnesota
| 73 || 53 || 29.7 || .511 || .359 || .826 || 3.7 || 2.8 || .8 || .3 || 11.6
|-
| align="left" | 
| align="left" | Minnesota
| 82 || 82 || 34.8 || .510 || .338 || .870 || 5.5 || 3.2 || .7 || .4 || 14.0
|-
| align="left" | 
| align="left" | Minnesota
| 82 || 82 || 38.0 || .508 || .455 || .831 || 4.8 || 3.1 || .8 || .3 || 18.7
|-
| align="left" | 
| align="left" | Minnesota
| 52 || 42 || 35.3 || .481 || .421 || .867 || 4.6 || 2.6 || .8 || .4 || 17.6
|-
| align="left" | 
| align="left" | Minnesota
| 28 || 0 || 22.2 || .449 || .435 || .828 || 3.1 || 1.2 || .4 || .0 || 10.2
|-
| align="left" | 
| align="left" | Minnesota
| 81 || 37 || 31.6 || .506 || .373 || .855 || 3.7 || 2.4 || .5 || .2 || 15.5
|-
| align="left" | 
| align="left" | Minnesota
| 40 || 40 || 38.9 || .495 || .406 || .896 || 4.8 || 2.8 || .5 || .4 || 20.1
|-
| align="left" | 
| align="left" | Boston
| 32 || 31 || 36.7 || .476 || .393 || .898 || 3.8 || 3.2 || .6 || .1 || 17.5
|-
| align="left" | 
| align="left" | Boston
| 32 || 19 || 28.1 || .415 || .415 || .897 || 3.1 || 1.7 || .6 || .1 || 15.0
|-
| align="left" | 
| align="left" | Seattle
| 50 || 1 || 23.6 || .460 || .428 || .843 || 2.7 || 1.4 || .3 || .1 || 13.1
|-
| align="left" | 
| align="left" | Cleveland
| 25 || 1 || 22.2 || .359 || .365 || .878 || 3.2 || 1.4 || .4 || .3 || 8.2
|-
| align="left" | 
| align="left" | Cleveland
| 74 || 5 || 20.6 || .450 || .411 || .849 || 3.1 || 1.1 || .4 || .1 || 7.0
|- class="sortbottom"
| style="text-align:center;" colspan="2"| Career
| 651 || 393 || 30.8 || .485 || .406 || .860 || 4.0 || 2.4 || .6 || .2 || 14.1
|- class="sortbottom"
| style="text-align:center;" colspan="2"| All-Star
| 1 || 0 || 12.0 || .667 || .667 || .000 || 3.0 || 3.0 || 1.0 || .0 || 10.0

Playoffs

|-
| align="left" | 2000
| align="left" | Minnesota
| 4 || 4 || 23.5 || .400 || .000 || .000 || 2.0 || .5 || .8 || .3 || 6.0
|-
| align="left" | 2001
| align="left" | Minnesota
| 4 || 4 || 35.8 || .486 || .000 || .800 || 4.5 || 2.5 || 1.3 || .8 || 14.0
|-
| align="left" | 2002
| align="left" | Minnesota
| 3 || 3 || 43.7 || .477 || .222 || .889 || 7.0 || 2.0 || .7 || .0 || 20.0
|-
| align="left" | 2003
| align="left" | Minnesota
| 6 || 6 || 42.0 || .475 || .214 || .867 || 5.0 || 2.2 || 1.0 || .2 || 14.5
|-
| align="left" | 2004
| align="left" | Minnesota
| 12 || 0 || 24.8 || .420 || .345 || .927 || 3.3 || 1.7 || .5 || .2 || 11.8
|-
| align="left" | 2008
| align="left" | Cleveland
| 13 || 13 || 28.8 || .376 || .323 || .929 || 1.8 || 1.5 || .2 || .1 || 10.8
|-
| align="left" | 2009
| align="left" | Cleveland
| 12 || 0 || 12.8 || .444 || .167 || .818 || 2.3 || .6 || .2 || .1 || 3.6
|- class="sortbottom"
| style="text-align:center;" colspan="2"| Career
| 54 || 30 || 26.8 || .427 || .285 || .882 || 3.1 || 1.4 || .5 || .2 || 10.2

References

External links

NBA profile (archived from 2008)
ESPN 1999 draft profile

1977 births
Living people
All-American college men's basketball players
American men's basketball players
American people of Ukrainian descent
Basketball players from Madrid
Basketball players from New York (state)
Boston Celtics players
Cleveland Cavaliers players
Cold Spring Harbor Jr./Sr. High School alumni
Competitors at the 1998 Goodwill Games
Competitors at the 2001 Goodwill Games
Goodwill Games medalists in basketball
Miami RedHawks men's basketball players
Minnesota Timberwolves draft picks
Minnesota Timberwolves players
National Basketball Association All-Stars
People from Cold Spring Harbor, New York
Seattle SuperSonics players
Shooting guards
Small forwards
Sportspeople from Suffolk County, New York
United States men's national basketball team players